Rui Afonso (born 1979) is a Portuguese politician of the Chega party who has been a member of the Assembly of the Republic since 2022 representing the Porto constituency.

Biography
Afonso studied a PhD in finance at the University of A Coruña in Spain. He began his professional career as an international insurance broker and then worked in the credit recovery department of a Portuguese finance company.

He joined Chega in 2019 and took over as head of the party in Porto after the original regional chairman resigned. In 2021, he was elected as a municipal councilor in Porto.

During the 2022 Portuguese legislative election, Afonso was elected to represent the Porto constituency. He has described himself as a conservative politically. In the Assembly, he has called for tougher anti-corruption and law & order policies, such as life imprisonment and chemical castration for convicted pedophiles.

References

1979 births
Portuguese politicians
21st-century Portuguese politicians
Chega politicians
Members of the Assembly of the Republic (Portugal)
Living people
People from Porto